The Kunstverein München (km) is a non-profit art association located in the Hofgarten in Munich, Germany. It was founded in 1823 and is one of the oldest German art associations.

The Kunstverein, a privately sponsored association with almost 1,300 members, focuses on solo and group exhibitions by international artists.

Since July 2019, Maurin Dietrich is the director of Kunstverein München. In October 2019, Gloria Hasnay joined the institution as curator.

History

Directors (selection) 
 1978–1985: Wolfgang Jean Stock
 1986–1991: Zdenek Felix
 1992–1995: Helmut Draxler
 1996–2001: Dirk Snauwaert
 2002–2004: Maria Lind
 2004–2009: Stefan Kalmár
 2010–2015: Bart van der Heide
 2015–2019: Chris Fitzpatrick
 since 2019: Maurin Dietrich

Partial list of exhibitions
 30 Jahre Kunst (2017), Jos de Gruyter and Harald Thys
 A rock that keeps tigers away (2017), nine artists including Simon Dybbroe Møller
 Serving Compressed Energy With Vacuum (2015), Anne-Mie van Kerckhoven
 Works by Ger van Elk (2014)
 Door Between Either And Or Part 1 (2013), twelve artists including Isa Genzken, Jeanne Mammen, Josephine Pryde, Carol Rama, and Amy Sillman
 4 projects in Mexico (2013), various artists
 The Li vi ng (2013), Rebecca Warren

References

Arts organisations based in Germany
Museums in Munich